Voyage to the Beginning of the World is a 1997 Portuguese-French drama film directed by Manoel de Oliveira and starring Marcello Mastroianni. The film was selected as the Portuguese entry for the Best Foreign Language Film at the 70th Academy Awards, but was not accepted as a nominee. It was Mastroianni's final film.

Plot
French actor Afonso visits the Portuguese village where his father once left. He is accompanied by the film director Manoel who hereby returns to the places of his childhood. Together with two other actors who serve as translators they make it to the remote village and meet Afonso's estranged kin.

Cast
 Marcello Mastroianni as Manoel
 Jean-Yves Gautier as Afonso
 Leonor Silveira as Judite
 Diogo Dória as Duarte
 Isabel de Castro as Maria Afonso
 Cécile Sanz de Alba as Christina
 José Pinto as José Afonso
 Adelaide Teixeira as Woman
 Isabel Ruth as Olga
 Manoel de Oliveira as Driver
 José Maria Vaz da Silva as Assistant
 Fernando Bento as Man 1
 Mário Moutinho as Man 2
 Jorge Mota as Man 3
 Sara Alves as Girl
 Helder Esteves as Boy

Accolades
The film was screened out of competition at the 1997 Cannes Film Festival where it won the FIPRESCI Prize.

See also
 List of submissions to the 70th Academy Awards for Best Foreign Language Film
 List of Portuguese submissions for the Academy Award for Best Foreign Language Film

References

External links
 

1997 films
1997 drama films
1990s Portuguese-language films
1990s French-language films
European Film Awards winners (films)
Films directed by Manoel de Oliveira
Films produced by Paulo Branco
Portuguese multilingual films
French multilingual films
1990s French films